The Ford CVH engine is a straight-four automobile engine produced by the Ford Motor Company. The engine's name is an acronym for either Compound Valve-angle Hemispherical or Canted Valve Hemispherical, where "Hemispherical" describes the shape of the combustion chamber. The CVH was introduced in 1980 in the third generation European Escort and in 1981 in the first generation North American Escort. Engines for North America were built in Ford's Dearborn Engine plant, while engines for Europe and the UK were built in Ford's then-new Bridgend Engine plant in Wales.

The CVH was produced in capacities from 1.1 to 2.0 L, with the smallest version offered exclusively in continental Europe, and the largest only in North America.

History and Details
The engine was originally conceived in 1974, and was a key plank of the "Erika" world car programme which spawned both the third-generation European Escort and the 1981 North American car of the same name.  Although the European and North American Escorts ended up being substantially different from each other in execution, the CVH engine was the one major common part shared between them.  The CVH largely replaced the overhead valve Kent ("Crossflow") engine in Ford of Europe's portfolio, although the 'short block' Valencia version of the Kent remained in production for many decades (ironically outliving the CVH by two years) - positioned below the CVH as an entry level engine in the smallest capacity Fiesta and Escort models.

The CVH is a cam-in-head design (as distinct from an overhead camshaft) with a single camshaft operating two valves per cylinder via rocker arms. As indicated by the name, the valves in original versions are mounted at a compound angle in order to allow for a  hemispherical combustion chamber, but without the need for dual camshafts (or an elaborate rocker system) which a "hemi" engine normally requires. The later "lean burn" versions of the engine launched in 1986 had reshaped combustion chambers to improve swirl, and were strictly speaking no longer hemi-headed at all. The CVH features hydraulic valve lifters, a first for a European Ford engine. In North America the engine was sold under different names, being called the "1.9L SEFI" from 1991 to 1996 in that market's Ford Escort, the "Split Port Induction 2000" or SPI2000 from 1997 to 2002, while from 2000 to 2004 it was simply the "Split Port" when offered in the Ford Focus.

1.1

The 1.1 L CVH had the shortest production life of the different variants. It debuted in the 1980 Escort MkIII for Continental Europe only, where it was offered as an alternative to the 1.1 L Valencia overhead valve (OHV) engine, which was the only 1.1 L engine offered in UK market Escorts. The 1.1 L CVH offered negligible improvements in economy or performance over the older Valencia unit, which was simpler and cheaper to manufacture, and hence was dropped in 1982.

Applications
 1980–1981 Ford Escort Mk 3 (Continental Europe only)

1.3
The 1.3 L CVH was introduced in the 1980 European Escort and used in the Orion and Fiesta from 1983 to 1986. The 1.3 L was to be offered in the North American Escort, but testing found it to be unacceptably underpowered, and plans to produce it in the US were scrapped just months before full-scale production was scheduled to start.

For the facelifted fourth generation European Escort of 1986, this CVH was replaced by a 1.3 L Valencia engine in entry level models, while higher trim level models used the 1.4 L CVH described below.

Applications
 1980–1986 Ford Escort Mk 3
 1983–1985 Ford Fiesta Mk 2
 1983–1986 Ford Orion Mk 1

1.4

The 1.4 L CVH replaced the 1.3 L CVH in the Escort, Orion and Fiesta from early 1986. In European trim, this engine produced .

Known as the 'Lean Burn' engine, it was designed primarily for fuel economy and featured a different cylinder head than other CVH engines. The Ford variable venturi carburetor was replaced by a Weber 28/30 TLDM which used a manifold vacuum-actuated secondary choke instead of the more usual sequential linkage which opens the secondary butterfly at 3/4 to full throttle. The 1.4 L version is less responsive to power modification than other CVH engines, and some common tuning parts cannot be used.

In South Africa, the 1.4 L CVH was fitted to the Ford Laser and Meteor, which were rebadged Mazda Familias. It replaced the 1.3 L Mazda E engine used in these cars and was itself replaced by the 1.3 L Mazda B engine.

Applications
 1986–1990 Ford Escort Mk 4
 1990–2000 Ford Escort Mk 5
 1986–1989 Ford Fiesta Mk 2
 1989–1995 Ford Fiesta Mk 3
 1986–1990 Ford Orion Mk 2
 1990–1992 Ford Orion Mk 3

CVH-PTE
The CVH-PTE is a revised version of the 1.4 L CVH introduced on the European Ford Fiesta 1.4 Si and Ford Escort in 1994. It features multi-point injection and a thicker crankcase to reduce harshness at high revs. Through the 1990s it was gradually phased out in favour of the newer Zetec 16-valve unit.

1.6
The naturally aspirated (NA) 1.6 L CVH debuted in the 1980 European Escort and the 1981 North American Escort.

European NA 1.6

A  version was offered in the Escort RS1600i developed by Ford Motorsport Germany for FIA Group A Homologation. This version featured a reworked cylinder head, solid cam followers and bronze bearings, and a host of other motorsport features.

European versions of the carbureted 1.6 L engine from the 1986 model year on were revised and, like the new 1.4 L, benefit from cylinder heads with a heart-shaped lean-burn combustion chambers and a slightly raised piston crown. The carburetor is a Weber twin venturi 28/32 TLDM unit. EFI versions used in the Escort XR3i, 1.6i and Fiesta XR2i retained hemispherical combustion chambers. From the 1989 model year all EFI variants are fitted with the Ford EEC-IV ECU.

Applications
 1980–1986 Ford Escort Mk 3
 1986–1990 Ford Escort Mk 4
 1983–1989 Ford Fiesta Mk 2
 1989–1992 Ford Fiesta Mk 3 (Replaced by Zetec from 1993 model year onward)
 1988–1993 Ford Sierra
 1983–1986 Ford Orion Mk 1
 1986–1990 Ford Orion Mk 2
 1990–1992 Ford Orion Mk 3
 1990–1991 Ford Escort Mk 5 (Replaced by Zetec in 1992)

North American NA 1.6
The early North American engines are built with cast pistons and connecting rods, a low-flow version of the CVH head, flat hydraulic lifters, a 0.229" lift camshaft, 32/32 Weber-licensed carburetor, cast exhaust manifold, and low-dome pistons.

A 1.6 L High Output (HO) motor became available in late 1982 through 1985.

A 1.6 L EFI motor became an option in 1983 through 1985. It had all the features of the HO (Higher Output) motor but had a totally different intake system to allow for multi-point EFI running on Ford's EEC-IV ECU. The 1.6 EFI shares the same head as the carbureted 1.6 found in North America but without a mechanical fuel pump. The 1.6 EFI engine was replaced by the 1.6 HO in all high-altitude regions, making the 1.6 EFI a rare model.

Applications
 1981–1984 Ford Escort
 1981–1984 Mercury Lynx
 1982–1983 Mercury LN7
 1982–1985 Ford EXP

Chinese production
Chery manufactures 1.6 L version to be used for their SEAT Toledo based vehicles. Chery purchased the production line for this engine in England, which then transferred to Anhui. The first engines left the production line in May 1999. The engine is codenamed SQR480. Later revision of SEAT Toledo based car made (Chery A15) doesn't use this engine, has been since replaced with ACTECO engine.

Applications:
 1999–2006 Chery A11

1.6 Turbo

European Turbo 1.6
A turbocharged version of the 1.6 L was developed by Ford Europe for the RS Turbo Escort and the later Ford Fiesta RS Turbo. The block is modified to provide an oil return from the turbocharger. Crankshaft and connecting rods are identical to the standard 1.6 L models, but the Mahle pistons are unique to the RS Turbo, and are manufactured using a pressure cast method which makes them considerably stronger and more expensive than the normal cast pistons. The compression ratio was reduced to 8.3:1, allowing the use of higher boost pressure. The engine only needs  of boost to produce its quoted power output.

Applications
 1980–1986 Ford Escort Mk 3
 1986–1990 Ford Escort Mk 4
 1989–1995 Ford Fiesta Mk 3

North American Turbo 1.6
The North American 1.6 turbocharged CVH was developed by Ford's Special Vehicle Operations (SVO) with help from Jack Roush for 1984 and 1985 in the Ford EXP Turbo, Ford Escort GT Turbo, and Mercury Lynx RS Turbo. At , its output is 50% higher than the carbureted North American 1.6 L HO, making it the most powerful production CVH offered in North America while returning impressive fuel efficiency and without reducing the engine's lifespan. The turbocharged engine featured a specially designed cam profile (0.240", comparable to the 1.6 HO and EFI camshafts), a Ford Performance/SVO modified head (comparable to European 1.6s), the EFI intake manifold, a unique cast exhaust manifold, low-dome pistons, and Ford's top-of-the-line EFI and ECU. These engines only appeared in the 1984–1985 Ford Escort GT Turbo and 1984–1985 Ford EXP Turbo, of which only about 10,000 were made in total. The 1.6 turbocharged Fords came standard with a TRX package that included upgraded suspension and specialty Michelin tires.

Applications
 1984–1985 Ford Escort
 1984–1985 Mercury Lynx
 1984–1985 Ford EXP

1.8
The 1.8 L CVH was only used in the European Ford Sierra. The cylinder head is equipped with hydraulic roller camshaft followers to reduce noise.

Applications
 1989–1993 Ford Sierra (Replaced the Ford Pinto engine from 1989 model year onward)

1.9

The CVH was enlarged to 1.9 L for the 1986 model year North American Escort. This stroke length was later used in the 2.0 L CVH engine, and again in the Zeta engine which replaced it. The long stroke necessitated a raised engine block deck, a design also shared with later units. All 1.9s from 1989 on are equipped with a roller camshaft and roller lifters. The camshaft and water pump are driven by the timing belt. This engine is a non-interference design. In models with electronic single-point fuel injection (or throttle-body injection, called Central Fuel Injection (CFI) by Ford), an additional  is produced, while torque is little changed.

The  1.9 L CFI engine of the late 1980s, particularly when equipped with either the four- or five-speed manual transaxle, was noted for delivering outstanding fuel economy.

Applications
 1986–1996 Ford Escort
 1985–1987 Mercury Lynx
 1991–1996 Mercury Tracer
 1986–1988 Ford EXP
 Gen 2 Spec Racer Ford

2.0
The 2.0 L was introduced in the 1997 North American Escort sedan and wagon as the SPI2000. Ford's Split Port Induction (SPI) system is a form of variable-length intake manifold. In this system, the intake path to each intake valve is split into primary and secondary passages. The primary passage contains the injector for the cylinder, and introduces the air tangentially to the cylinder for maximum swirl. The secondary passage contains an intake manifold runner control (IMRC) deactivation valve which opens for high speed and wide-open throttle (WOT) situations to provide a minimally restricted path for additional air to maximize volumetric efficiency and power. As with the 1.9, the water pump is driven by the timing belt. Like the 1.9 L, this engine is a non-interference design. It is the last CVH engine made, and production ended with the 2004 Ford Focus LX/SE sedan and wagons. These engines have "2.0L Split Port" in raised letters on the top of the valve cover.

Applications
 1997–2002 Ford Escort
 1997–1999 Mercury Tracer
 2000–2004 Ford Focus

Common problems

Noise, vibration, harshness
Throughout its 20-year production life, the CVH had a reputation for excessive noise, vibration, and harshness (NVH). Jeremy Clarkson said of the CVH-powered Escort that "it was powered by engines so rough, even Moulinex wouldn't use them". This harshness is mostly due to the cylinder head and valvetrain design. At  at full lift, the valve springs in the CVH are considerably stiffer than is typical in other engines due to the angle at which the valves are positioned in the combustion chamber - necessitated by the need to create a "hemi" design with a single camshaft. The stiff springs are needed to prevent valve float, which they do up to around 6700 rpm, and also overcome the weight of the rocker arms and hydraulic self adjusting tappets used. The stiff valve springs add more friction and pressure to the already high friction "flat tappet" design.

Sludge
The camshaft is oiled by small holes in the cylinder head casting next to the lifter bores. These holes are prone to blocking up with oil sludge if the engine is not serviced regularly, starving the camshaft of oil. The CVH is known for producing excessive sludge if the service schedule is ignored or if poor quality oil is used. The cause is the design of the crankcase ventilation circuit, which Ford revised several times over the engine's lifetime but never completely cured. Due to this, camshaft and tappet wear problems are common. A worn camshaft can cause heavy clattering and ticking from the engine's top end, especially at high engine speeds.

Valve seat failure
A common problem with later CVHs is their tendency to drop a valve seat, which happens most often in VIN number P engines. This can occur with no warning, even if the engine has been well maintained. In most cases, a seat drops on the number 4 cylinder, with the next most common being the number 2 cylinder. When the valve seat drops out of the cylinder head, it falls into the cylinder and damages the cylinder wall, piston, and cylinder head. In some cases, the valve seat is drawn from its cylinder through the intake manifold into another cylinder, where it causes damage.

Kits cars, limited production cars, tuners
Apart from Ford's own models, the CVH engine was used in a number of vehicles built by small volume manufacturers, and was offered as an option in some owner-assembled cars. Several companies also began supplying performance parts and complete engines for CVH owners in search of more power.

Small volume applications:
 1984–1990 Reliant Scimitar SS1 — 1.3 L, 1.4 L, 1.6 L
 1990–1992 Reliant Scimitar SST — 1.3 L, 1.4 L
 1992–1993 Reliant Scimitar Sabre — 1.4 L
 1982–1993 Morgan 4/4 — 1.6 L
 1983–1989 Panther Kallista — 1.6 L

Kit car applications:
 Westfield Sportscars SE — 1.6 L
 Sylva Mojo and Mojo 2
 Stuart Taylor Mark 1.

Tuners:
 Burton Power.
 Specialised Engines.
 Ferriday Engineering.
 Norris Motorsport.

Hybrid engines

Schrick 16V 
In 1982 the German company Dr. Schrick GmbH, later renamed AVL Schrick, developed a double overhead camshaft (DOHC) multi-valve cylinder head for the 1.6 L CVH block. Each of the two overhead camshafts is installed in a separate camshaft carrier that is attached to the main body of the cylinder head. Each carrier has its own cam cover. Fitted with an original RS1600i engine intake manifold, a tubular exhaust manifold, and modified ignition, prototype engines developed .

In contrast to cylinder head conversions produced for Ford by Cosworth, the Schrick cylinder head never went into series production. With the introduction of the multi-valve Zetec engine, Schrick stopped development.

ZVH/ZE-VH 
The ZVH or ZE-VH engine mounts a CVH 8 valve cylinder head on a Zeta/Zetec engine block. This is possible because the cylinder bore spacing, locations of the water and oil passages, and the cylinder head bolts on these engines are identical. 

This combination of parts allowed the owner of a CVH-powered car to retain the cylinder head and associated parts from the original engine while substituting a stronger, large displacement engine block. Some builders have built ZVH engines that used the cylinder head, fuel injection system, ignition system, exhaust manifold, and turbocharger from the Escort RS combined with a Zetec block.

The engine's name indicates a Zetec/CVH hybrid.

See also
 List of Ford engines

References

Further reading

External links

 
 

CVH
Gasoline engines by model
Straight-four engines